A democratic empire is a political state which conducts its internal affairs democratically (i.e. with respect for its citizens and their collective will) but externally its policies have a striking resemblance to imperial rule.

Democratic imperialism as such may in fact be a misnomer, as empires express themselves with aggression abroad and repression at home. The concept of a democratic empire can likewise be an instrument of social control as with ideology and ideological conditioning generally. Examples of empires that have been described in this way are the British Empire, the French colonial empire, the Roman Republic and the United States of America based on some of its foreign affairs history (see American imperialism).

References

Empires
Democracy